Luke O'Reilly may refer to:
Luke O'Reilly (alpine skier), British former alpine skier
Luke O'Reilly (Bel's Boys), Northern Irish actor and musician
Luke O'Reilly (cricketer) (born 1977), cricketer